Vanchi LaShawn Jefferson Jr. (born July 26, 1996) is an American football wide receiver for the Los Angeles Rams of the National Football League (NFL). He played college football at Ole Miss and Florida and was drafted by the Rams in the second round of the 2020 NFL Draft.

Early life and high school
Born and raised in Brentwood, Tennessee, Jefferson attended Ravenwood High School. As a junior, he caught 87 passes for 1,251 yards and 14 touchdowns. He was named first team All-State after recording 67 receptions for 1,223 yards and 13 touchdowns and initially committed to play college football at Georgia. Jefferson de-committed from Georgia in January of his senior year and ultimately signed to play at Ole Miss.

College career
In 2015, Jefferson redshirted his true freshman season at Ole Miss. In 2016, as a redshirt freshman, he had 49 catches for 543 yards and three touchdowns. Jefferson finished his redshirt sophomore season with 42 receptions for 456 yards and one touchdown. Following the 2017 season, Jefferson announced his intent to transfer from Ole Miss after the program was sanctioned by the NCAA, ultimately choosing to continue his collegiate career at Florida.

Jefferson was granted immediate eligibility to play for Florida after transferring after receiving waivers from the NCAA and the Southeastern Conference (SEC). In 2018, his first season with the Gators, he led the team with 35 receptions, 503 receiving yards, and six touchdown receptions. As a senior, he caught 49 passes for 657 yards and six touchdowns. He caught six passes for 129 yards against Virginia in the 2019 Orange Bowl, his final career game. Jefferson finished his collegiate career with 175 receptions for 2,159 yards and 16 touchdowns in 45 games played.

Professional career

Jefferson was selected by the Los Angeles Rams in the second round with the 57th overall pick in the 2020 NFL Draft. The Rams previously traded wide receiver Brandin Cooks to the Houston Texans to acquire the pick.

2020
In Week 11, against the Tampa Bay Buccaneers, he recorded his first professional receiving touchdown.

In the Divisional Round of the playoffs against the Green Bay Packers, Jefferson recorded 6 catches for 46 yards and his first playoff touchdown during the 32–18 loss.

2021
In 2021, Jefferson saw an increase in production playing under new Rams quarterback Matthew Stafford and in light of a season-ending injury to teammate Robert Woods.  Through Week 14, Jefferson had 47 receptions, 708 receiving yards and 5 touchdowns. Jefferson became a Super Bowl champion when the Rams beat the Cincinnati Bengals 23-20 in Super Bowl LVI. In the Super Bowl, Jefferson recorded 4 catches for 23 yards.

2022
On September 24, 2022, Jefferson was placed on injured reserve. He was designated to return from injured reserve on October 24, 2022, and activated for Week 8.

On December 8, 2022, Jefferson caught the game winning touchdown pass from newly signed quarterback Baker Mayfield to beat the Las Vegas Raiders.

Personal life
Jefferson is the son of NFL coach and former wide receiver Shawn Jefferson. 

Jefferson has a daughter and two sons. His second son was born on February 13, 2022, after Jefferson's wife, Samaria Jefferson, went into labor during Super Bowl LVI.

References

External links
Ole Miss Rebels bio
Florida Gators bio
Los Angeles Rams bio

1996 births
Living people
American football wide receivers
Florida Gators football players
Players of American football from Tennessee
Ole Miss Rebels football players
People from Brentwood, Tennessee
Los Angeles Rams players